The President’s Gardens is a novel written by the Iraqi author Muhsin al-Ramli. Set during the last fifty years of Iraqi history, this novel tells the story of three friends, exploring how ordinary people have been affected by historic events such as wars, the blockade of Iraq and the invasion of Kuwait. It examines the gap between the lifestyle of those in power and ordinary citizens. During the chaos of occupation, one of them loses his life, like so many caught between loyalists of the old and new regimes. The President's Gardens helps the reader understand the complexities of the successive tragedies besetting the ‘land between two rivers’. The gripping story is told with humanity, and life is somehow the victor despite all the obstacles.

External links
 Interview with the author
 IPAF
 Longlist Announced for 2013 International Prize for Arabic Fiction
 Looking at the 2013 Longlist: Muhsin al-Ramli’s ‘The President’s Gardens’
 About The President’s Gardens in Aljazeera.net

Arabic-language novels
2012 novels
Iraqi novels
Novels set in Iraq